Consensual Living, CL, is a philosophy derived from the principles of consensus decision-making which advocates a consent-based approach to conflict resolution. 
The process of finding solutions in this model usually includes the communication of individual needs and the brainstorming of possible solution which will successfully address the needs of all parties, based on finding a common preference. 

CL adopts the democratic principle of equality by which the wants and needs of everyone involved are considered equally in the process of problem solving, regardless of an individual’s age or position. Because of this stance, CL is sometimes regarded as a parenting philosophy, where children are considered to have an equal say in family decision making.

References

Parenting
Social movements